The Sunbeam is a 1912 American film directed by D. W. Griffith.

Plot

A small child whose mother is dying wanders out of the room and unites a stern spinster and unhappy bachelor by virtue of her innocent appeal. They discover the mother dead and, one presumes, plight their troth to find happiness, and care for the newly minted orphan. No-one emotes too much about the recently dead mother who is lying dead beside them when this is going on

Cast 
Ynez Seabury as Sunbeam
Kate Bruce as Sunbeam's Mamma
Claire McDowell as Spinster
Dell Henderson as Bachelor

References

External links 

1912 films
American silent short films
1910s English-language films
American black-and-white films
Films directed by D. W. Griffith
1912 romantic drama films
American romantic drama films
1910s American films
Silent romantic drama films
Silent American drama films